Samantha Ryan Hiatt (born January 6, 1998) is an American professional soccer player who plays as a defender for OL Reign of the National Women's Soccer League (NWSL).

Club career

OL Reign
Hiatt made her NWSL debut on October 17, 2020.

Honors
 with OL Reign
 NWSL Shield: 2022
 The Women's Cup: 2022

Personal life
Hiatt is of Filipino descent.

References

External links
 
 Stanford Cardinal profile
 

1998 births
Living people
American women's soccer players
Boston College Eagles women's soccer players
National Women's Soccer League players
OL Reign draft picks
OL Reign players
Stanford Cardinal women's soccer players
United States women's under-20 international soccer players
Women's association football defenders
American sportspeople of Filipino descent